Nativus is the debut studio album by the Brazilian Reggae band Nativus. The album was produced by Nativus and Rodrigo Vidal.

Commercial performance 
Nativus has been certified gold by the Associação Brasileira dos Produtores de Discos (ABPD). The album sold 450,000 copies in Brazil.

Track listing

Certifications

References

1998 albums
Portuguese-language albums
Natiruts albums